Sir William Joseph Connor (born 21 May 1941), usually referred to as Bill Connor, is a former British trade unionist, Labour politician and General Secretary of USDAW

Connor was a former leader of the Labour group on West Lancashire Council. In 1997, he was elected General Secretary of USDAW, a position he retained until he retired in 2004.

He received a knighthood in the 2003 New Year Honours

References

Living people
General Secretaries of the Union of Shop, Distributive and Allied Workers
Knights Bachelor
1941 births
Members of the General Council of the Trades Union Congress